Clay Township is one of ten townships located in Adair County, Missouri, United States.  As of the 2010 census, its population was 626. It is named in honor of Kentucky politician Henry Clay.

Geography
It contains one cemetery, Richardson.

The streams of Bee Branch, Cottonwood Fork, Floyd Creek and Willow Branch run through this township.

References

 USGS Geographic Names Information System (GNIS)

External links
 US-Counties.com
 City-Data.com

Townships in Adair County, Missouri
Kirksville micropolitan area, Missouri
Townships in Missouri